Lisa Thomas is an American politician and psychiatrist serving as a member of the Missouri House of Representatives. Elected in November 2020 from district 124, she assumed office on January 6, 2021. After redistricting in 2022, she was reelected from district 123.

Education 
Thomas earned a Bachelor of Arts degree in biology and psychology and Master of Arts in clinical psychology from the Washington University in St. Louis, followed by a Doctor of Medicine from the University of Missouri School of Medicine.

Career 
Thomas worked as a psychiatrist at the Harry S. Truman Memorial Veterans' Hospital until 2016. She is the part-time medical director of the Missouri Physicians Health Program. Thomas was elected to the Missouri House of Representatives in November 2020 and assumed office on January 6, 2021.

Electoral History

State Representative

References 

Living people
Washington University in St. Louis alumni
University of Missouri alumni
Republican Party members of the Missouri House of Representatives
Women state legislators in Missouri
American psychiatrists
Physicians from Missouri
Year of birth missing (living people)